District 15 or 15th district can refer to:

U.S. political districts
Federal level
 Illinois's 15th congressional district
 Michigan's 15th congressional district
 Pennsylvania's 15th congressional district
 Ohio's 15th congressional district
State-level
 15th Legislative District (New Jersey)
 Pennsylvania Senate, District 15
 Texas Senate, District 15
 Wisconsin Senate, District 15
Municipal level
 Los Angeles City Council District 15

North American school districts
Canada
 New Brunswick School District 15
United States
 Regional School District 15 (Connecticut)
 Community Consolidated School District 15 (Illinois)
 Maine School Administrative District 15 (Maine)

Other municipal districts
 15th arrondissement of Paris
 15th arrondissement of Marseille
 15th district of Budapest